Jean Reese Worthley (February 23, 1925 – April 9, 2017) was an American naturalist. She hosted Maryland Public Broadcasting's children's television series Hodgepodge Lodge and co-hosted On Nature's Trail. She also wrote The Complete Family Nature Guide, which was published in 1976.

Education 
Worthley graduated from Franklin High School in 1940. At the age of 15, she enrolled at Goucher College where she graduated with a bachelor's degree in biology in 1944. She later attended University of Massachusetts Amherst, funded by a G.I. Bill. In 1948, Worthley graduated with a master's degree in entomology and zoology. The next year, at University of Maryland, College Park, she took graduate courses in human development and childhood studies.

References

External links 
 
 

1925 births
2017 deaths
American naturalists
Goucher College alumni
University of Massachusetts Amherst College of Natural Sciences alumni
University of Maryland, College Park alumni
20th-century American women
21st-century American women
Women naturalists
American television hosts
American women television personalities
American women television presenters
20th-century American people